Lowertown may refer to:


Places

Canada
an alternative spelling of Lower Town, Ottawa, Ontario, Canada

England
Lowertown, Luxulyan, Cornwall
Lowertown or Lowertown-by-Helston, Cornwall
Lowertown, Devon

Northern Ireland
Lowertown, County Tyrone, a townland

Republic of Ireland
Lowertown, County Monaghan, a townland in the civil parish of Clones
Lowertown, County Westmeath, a townland in the civil parish of Rahugh, barony of Moycashel

Scotland
Lowertown, Orkney

United States
Lowertown Historic District (Lockport, New York), a district of Niagara County
Lowertown Historic District (Saint Paul, Minnesota), a neighborhood and historic district

Other 
 Lowertown, band who released I Love to Lie in 2022